Andre Agassi was the defending champion and won for the second straight year in the final 7–6(7–3), 6–1, over Yevgeny Kafelnikov.

Seeds

Draw

Key
WC - Wildcard
Q - Qualifier
SE - Special Exempt
r - Retired

Finals

Earlier rounds

Section 1

Section 2

Section 3

Section 4

External links
 Singles draw

1999 ATP Tour